Karunakaran (born 28 January 1981) is an Indian actor who mainly appears in character or comedian roles in Tamil cinema. He made his breakthrough in the film Soodhu Kavvum (2013). He also appeared in supporting roles in Yaamirukka Bayamey (2014), Jigarthanda (2014) and Indru Netru Naalai (2015).

Career 
Karunakaran's father is a former RAW agent and he grew up in New Delhi, before moving to Trichy with his parents, where he met short film maker and friend Nalan Kumarasamy. He completed his secondary schooling at St. John's Vestry Anglo Indian Hr. Sec. School, Trichy. It is during his school days, where he met his longtime friend Srikanth Ravikumar, who is one of the biggest entrepreneur who has settled in Malaysia. He initially made a career as chemical engineer, graduating from SASTRA University, and then as an IT professional at Accenture, before Nalan approached him to feature in a short film he was making for the reality television show, Naalaya Iyakkunar. Karunakaran had featured in such short film ventures at school and Nalan had cast him in Nenjuku Neethi, which went on to win the first place award that season. Sundar C gave him brief roles in two of his ventures, while he made his first breakthrough portraying Vijay Sethupathi's friend in Karthik Subbaraj's Pizza (2012), after which he left work and concentrated on a career in films.

Nalan subsequently cast him in his feature film debut Soodhu Kavvum (2013), for which Karunakaran won rave reviews. His appearance in the "Kasu Panam Thuttu" song also was well received and prompted several further offers for the actor. His performance in Yaamirukka Bayamey (2014) was appreciated by critics. The Times of India wrote, "A large part of the credit should go to Karuna, who manages to make Sharath both ambivalent and funny", while Sify wrote that he was "a scream" and The Hindu called it an "exceptional performance". Karunakaran, rose to fame in comical roles he did in such films as Yaamirukka Bayamey (2014) and Jigarthanda (2014).

Karunakaran bags the Best Comedian Award for his role in the movie Indru Netru Naalai (2015). In 2019, he make his TV début with ‘Asaalta Alaravidum Pullingo’ on Discovery Network's Tamil channel. These movies like Monster (2019) and Maanaadu (2021) which have been successful. Supposed to release in 2019, the comedy Panni Kutty, playing with Yogi Babu was finally released in 2022.

Filmography

Films

Television

Web series

References

External links

Karunakaran on Moviebuff

Living people
Tamil comedians
Male actors from Chennai
Male actors in Tamil cinema
Indian male comedians
21st-century Indian male actors
Tamil male actors
1981 births